This is a list of Portuguese television related events from 1997.

Events
Unknown - Bárbara Guimarães takes over from José Nuno Martins as host of Chuva de Estrelas.
Unknown - The fourth series of Chuva de Estrelas was won by Jessi Leal, performing as Kate Bush.
15 September - SIC introduces an updated version of their logo. At the same time, its international feed is launched.

Debuts

International
 Sabrina, the Teenage Witch (Unknown)

Television shows

1990s
Chuva de Estrelas (1993-2000)

Ending this year

Births

Deaths